The Cretan wildcat is a member of the genus Felis that inhabits the Greek island of Crete. Its taxonomic status is unclear at present, as some biologists consider it probably introduced, or a European wildcat (Felis silvestris silvestris), or a hybrid between European wildcat and domestic cat (F. catus).
Felis silvestris cretensis was proposed as scientific name for the Cretan wildcat in 1953 by Theodor Haltenorth. He described two cat skins that were purchased in a bazaar in Chania and resembled a skin of an African wildcat (Felis lybica lybica), but with a bushy tail like a European wildcat.
In the 1980s, Colin Groves measured and assessed zoological specimens of cats that originated in the Mediterranean islands. He concluded that the two cat skins from Crete differed from true wildcat specimens and therefore considered them feral cats.

Crete has been isolated from the continent for about 6 million years. Palaeontological data indicate that the island was colonised during the Pleistocene by those mammalian taxa that were able to swim across the sea. Crete's Pleistocene endemic mammalian fauna comprised rodents and herbivores, but remains of predators were not found. Pleistocene mammals died out before the Holocene.
More than 9,000 animal bones were excavated at the archaeological site Kavousi Kastro in eastern Crete in the late 1980s that date to the Late Geometric period at about 8th century BC. These faunal remains also included one cat that was identified as domestic cat.
Fragments of a domestic cat were also found at the archaeological site Gortyn dating to the 6th to 7th century AD.

In October 2017, Greek news sites circulated reports that a sheep farmer captured a wild cat after laying traps for a predator that attacked young sheep of his herd. The reports were accompanied by photographs and video footage of the captured animal.

References

Wildcats
Mammals described in 1953
Fauna of Crete
Feral cats